Ukiah may refer to:

Places
Ukiah, California, a city in the U.S. state of California
Ukiah, Oregon, a city in the U.S. state of Oregon
Ukiah Valley, a valley in Mendocino County, California

Other uses
 "Ukiah", a song by the Doobie Brothers, from the album The Captain and Me.
 Ukiah Oregon, a fictional character in a series of science fiction books by Wen Spencer
 Yuki language, a language spoken by the Yuki Indians of California, also known as the Ukiah language
 Yuki people, an indigenous people of California

See also
Yuki (disambiguation)